Snow algae are a group of freshwater micro-algae which grow in the alpine and polar regions of the earth. These algae have been observed to come in a variety of colors associated with both the individual species, stage of life or topography/geography. This variation is associated with both albedo differences of the snowy habitat and the presence of micro-invertebrates. Snow algae play a critical role in the trophic organization as primary producers who in turn are consumed primarily by tardigrades and rotifers. Snow algae have also been found to travel great distances being carried by winds.

References

Algae
Aquatic ecology